= Dwijraj Mishra =

Dwijdeo Mishra was a king of the Mishra dynasty, the last royal rulers of the Ayodhya.
